Bennett Metcalfe (October 31, 1919 – October 14, 2003) was a Canadian journalist and first chairman of Greenpeace, which was founded in 1971.

Ben Metcalfe was born in Winnipeg. Later he moved to the United Kingdom and at the age of 16 joined the Royal Air Force. He was posted in India and North Africa. After World War II he worked as journalist in France. He moved back to Canada in 1951, living in Winnipeg, West Vancouver, and Shawnigan Lake. He worked as a journalist, editor, and freelance correspondent for Winnipeg Free Press, the Province in Vancouver and other publications. He also started a public relations company with his second wife Dorothy.

In 1971 he joined the crew member of the Greenpeace boat sailing to protest against U.S. army nuclear bomb test near Amchitka island. When the Greenpeace Foundation was established, Metcalfe became its first chairman. He recognized the importance of a media campaign as a tool to gain support  for environmental issues. He left his post when Greenpeace changed focus from nuclear weapons to fighting against whaling and seal hunting.

He is the author of a biography of Roderick Langmere Haig-Brown:

Metcalfe, E. Bennett (1985). A man of some importance : the life of Roderick Langmere Haig-Brown Published by James W. Wood, Vancouver. , .

Metcalfe died of a heart attack at age 83. He had three daughters Michelle, Charlotte, and Sophie; and sons Christopher (1958-1980), and Michael (1956-2002)

References

External links
 Article in Globe and Mail
 Obituary
 Metcalfe reporting aboard Greenpeace vessel (CBC archive)

Canadian environmentalists
Journalists from Manitoba
People from Winnipeg
1919 births
2003 deaths
People associated with Greenpeace
Canadian expatriates in the United Kingdom
Canadian expatriates in France
Royal Air Force personnel of World War II